The following is a list of notable deaths in November 2017.

Entries for each day are listed alphabetically by surname. A typical entry lists information in the following sequence:
 Name, age, country of citizenship at birth, subsequent country of citizenship (if applicable), what subject was noted for, cause of death (if known), and reference.

November 2017

1
Brad Bufanda, 34, American actor (Veronica Mars, A Cinderella Story, Co-Ed Confidential), suicide by jumping.
Ramón Cabrero, 69, Spanish-born Argentine football player and coach (Lanús), stroke.
Pablo Cedrón, 59, Argentine actor (You Are the One, El Viento).
Eifion Evans, 86, Welsh church historian.
Tor Henriksen, 84, Norwegian politician.
Rosemary Lassig, 76, Australian swimmer, Olympic silver medalist (1960), complications from Alzheimer's disease.
Katie Lee, 98, American folk singer and environmentalist.
Václav Machek, 91, Czech Olympic cyclist.
Vladimir Makanin, 80, Russian writer.
John Mecray, 80, American painter, acute myeloid leukemia.
Richard P. Mills, 72, American educator, Commissioner of Education of New York (1995–2009), heart attack.
Paul V. Mullaney, 97, American politician and judge, Mayor of Worcester, Massachusetts (1963–1965).
Myron Noodleman, 59, American baseball clown, sinus cancer.
Yisrael Rosen, 76, Israeli Orthodox rabbi.
Serhiy Ryzhkov, 59, Ukrainian shipwright and ecologist.
James Tayoun, 87, American politician, member of the Pennsylvania House of Representatives (1969–1970).
Peter Toms, 84, Australian politician, member of the New South Wales Legislative Assembly for Maitland (1981).
Massimo Wilde, 73, Italian politician, Senator (1994–2001).

2
Francis Allotey, 85, Ghanaian mathematician and professor (KNUST), founding fellow of the African Academy of Sciences.
Afif Bahnassi, 89, Syrian art historian.
Costanzo Balleri, 84, Italian football player (Internazionale, Livorno) and manager (Livorno).
Lady Ursula d'Abo, 100, English socialite.
John Paul De Cecco, 92, American professor (San Francisco State University), pioneer of sexuality studies.
Orval H. Hansen, 91, American politician, member of the U.S. House of Representatives for Idaho's 2nd congressional district (1969–1975), complications from cancer.
Bob Harper, 72, Australian politician, member of the Legislative Assembly of Queensland (1995–1998).
William Landau, 93, American neurologist, co-namesake of Landau–Kleffner syndrome.
Sir Michael Latham, 74, British politician, MP for Melton (1974–1983) and Rutland and Melton (1983–1992).
Sarah Maguire, 60, English poet and translator, breast cancer.
David Muise, 68, Canadian politician, MLA (1978–1981) and Mayor of Cape Breton Regional Municipality (1997–2000).
Paddy Russell, 89, British television director (Doctor Who, Out of the Unknown, The Omega Factor).
*María Martha Serra Lima, 72, Argentine ballad and bolero singer.
Manlio Simonetti, 91, Italian Biblical scholar.
Aboubacar Somparé, 73, Guinean politician, President of the National Assembly (2002–2008).
Joan Tisch, 90, American socialite, heiress to the Loews Corporation.
Ron Van Horne, 85, Canadian politician, Ontario MPP (1977–1998).
Dina Wadia, 98, Indian political figure, pneumonia.
Bill Wilkerson, 72, American radio newsreader and sports announcer (KMOX, Missouri Tigers, St. Louis football Cardinals).

3
Gaetano Bardini, 91, Italian opera singer, heart disease.
Trevor Bell, 87, British artist.
Abdur Rahman Biswas, 91, Bangladeshi politician, President (1991–1996), heart failure.
Sid Catlett, 69, American basketball player (Cincinnati Royals), complications from brain hemorrhage.
Ed Flanagan, 66, American politician, member of the Vermont Senate (2005–2011).
William Frye, 96, American producer.
Ismail Juma, 26, Tanzanian long-distance runner, motorcycle crash.
Jiří Kormaník, 82, Czechoslovakian wrestler, Olympic silver medalist (1964).
Václav Riedlbauch, 70, Czech composer, pedagogue, manager and politician, Minister of Culture (2009–2010).

4
Jaakko Asikainen, 76, Finnish Olympic sports shooter.
Michael Augustine, 84, Indian Roman Catholic prelate, Bishop of Vellore (1981–1992) and Archbishop of Pondicherry and Cuddalore (1992–2004).
Cheng Ch'ing-wen, 85, Taiwanese writer, heart attack.
Isabel Granada, 41, Filipino actress and singer, aneurysm.
Beryl Grant, 96, Australian community worker.
Tamara Natalie Madden, 42, Jamaican artist, ovarian cancer.
João de Matos, 62, Angolan military officer.
Derek Morgan, 88, English cricketer (Derbyshire).
Luis Poggi, 88, Peruvian cyclist.
Ned Romero, 90, American actor (Dan August, Hang 'Em High, Star Trek).
Malcolm Scott, 59, Australian football player.
Dudley Simpson, 95, Australian composer (Doctor Who, Blake's 7) and conductor (Royal Opera House).
C. W. Smith, 70, American NASCAR driver.
Tallys, 30, Brazilian footballer (Paysandu), traffic collision.
Anna Diggs Taylor, 84, American federal judge, United States District Court for the Eastern District of Michigan (1979–1998).
Gene Verble, 89, American baseball player (Washington Senators).
Regina Yaou, 62, Ivorian writer.

5
Renzo Calegari, 84, Italian cartoonist (Storia del West), stroke.
Digger Crown, 20, Swedish racehorse, euthanized.
Don Eddy, 81, American college basketball coach (UTSA Roadrunners, Eastern Illinois Panthers).
Robin Esser, 84, British newspaper executive (Sunday Express, Daily Mail).
Nancy Friday, 84, American author (My Secret Garden, Forbidden Flowers, Women on Top), complications from Alzheimer's disease.
Bob Girard, 69, Canadian ice hockey player (Washington Capitals).
Helen John, 80, British anti-war activist.
William Klemperer, 90, American chemist.
Robert Knight, 77, American R&B singer ("Everlasting Love", "Love on a Mountain Top").
Murray Koffler, 93, Canadian pharmacist and businessman, founder of Shoppers Drug Mart.
Mansour bin Muqrin, 43–44, Saudi businessman, Vice Governor of 'Asir (since 2013), helicopter crash.
Sir Hugh Neill, 96, British businessman and public servant.
Louis Roney, 96, American opera singer.
Geoff Rothwell, 97, British Royal Air Force bomber pilot of the Second World War.
Vera Shlakman, 108, American economist and professor.
George Edward Tait, 73, American poet.
Dionatan Teixeira, 25, Brazilian-born Slovak footballer (Košice, Stoke City), heart attack.
Lothar Thoms, 61, German track cyclist, Olympic champion (1980).

6
Roger Becker, 83, British tennis player.
Jansug Charkviani, 86, Georgian poet and politician, MP (1995–2003), Shota Rustaveli laureate (1984).
Dave Cloutier, 78, American football player (Boston Patriots).
Karin Dor, 79, German actress (You Only Live Twice, Topaz, The Spy with Ten Faces).
Joe Fortunato, 87, American football player (Chicago Bears).
Marek Frąckowiak, 67, Polish stage and film actor, spinal cancer.
Scott Fredericks, 74, Irish actor (Doctor Who, See No Evil, Triangle).
Richard F. Gordon Jr., 88, American astronaut (Gemini 11, Apollo 12).
Günter Hoge, 77, German footballer (1. FC Union Berlin, East Germany national team).
Jacques Landriault, 96, Canadian Roman Catholic prelate, Bishop of Hearst (1964–1971) and Timmins (1971–1990).
Susan Linnee, 75, American journalist.
Clem Parker, 90, New Zealand Olympic sprinter.
Feliciano Rivilla, 81, Spanish footballer (Atlético de Madrid, national team).
Andrés Sapelak, 97, Polish-born Argentine Ukrainian Greek Catholic hierarch, Bishop of Santa María del Patrocinio in Buenos Aires (1968–1997).
Rhona Silver, 66, American catering executive, heart attack.
Rick Stelmaszek, 69, American baseball player (Texas Rangers) and coach (Minnesota Twins), pancreatic cancer.
Kasëm Trebeshina, 92, Albanian writer.
William Weintraub, 91, Canadian journalist, author and filmmaker.

7
Paul Buckmaster, 71, English arranger (Elton John, The Rolling Stones) and composer (12 Monkeys), Grammy winner (2002).
Debra Chasnoff, 60, American documentary filmmaker (Deadly Deception: General Electric, Nuclear Weapons and Our Environment), Oscar winner (1992), breast cancer.
Robert De Cormier, 95, American composer and conductor (The Belafonte Folk Singers).
James B. Engle, 98, American diplomat, Ambassador to Benin (1974–1976).
Wendell Eugene, 94, American jazz trombonist.
Wahome Gakuru, 51, Kenyan politician, traffic collision.
Pentti Glan, 71, Finnish-Canadian drummer (Alice Cooper, Lou Reed, Mandala), lung cancer.
João Hall Themido, 93, Portuguese diplomat, Ambassador to the United States (1971–1981).
Roy Halladay, 40, American baseball player (Toronto Blue Jays, Philadelphia Phillies), Cy Young Award winner (2003, 2010), plane crash.
Brad Harris, 84, American actor and stuntman (Kommissar X, Goliath Against the Giants, The Pirates of the Mississippi).
Loren Hightower, 89, American dancer.
Dolores Kendrick, 90, American poet, complications from cancer.
M. Nannan, 94, Indian educationist.
Paddles, 1, New Zealand polydactyl cat, co-owned by Prime Minister Jacinda Ardern, traffic collision.
Brian Perry, 74, English cricketer (Shropshire).
Hans-Michael Rehberg, 79, German actor (Schindler's List).
Michael Ryan, 75, Australian Olympic hurdler (1964).
Carl Sargeant, 49, Welsh politician, AM (since 2003), suicide by hanging.
Hans Schäfer, 90, German footballer (1. FC Köln, West Germany national team), FIFA World Cup winner (1954).
Amelia Toledo, 90, Brazilian sculptor and painter.

8
Antonio Carluccio, 80, Italian chef, restaurateur and television presenter (Two Greedy Italians), fall.
John H. Cushman, 96, American military officer, Commander of the I Corps (1976–1978) and the 101st Airborne Division (1972–1973), stroke.
Eva Ernström, 56, Swedish Olympic athlete (1984).
Roger Grenier, 98, French writer and journalist.
Tim Gudgin, 87, British radio presenter.
Pat Hutchins, 75, British illustrator, author and actress (Rosie and Jim), cancer.
Geoffrey Jameson, 89, Australian Olympic wrestler.
Jo Jeonggwon, 68, South Korean poet and critic.
Janusz Kłosiński, 96, Polish actor.
Doug Moseley, 89, American author and politician.
Wood Moy, 99, American actor (Chan Is Missing, Howard the Duck, Final Analysis).
Don Prince, 79, American baseball player (Chicago Cubs).
Jean-Pierre Pujol, 76, French politician, Deputy for Gers's 1st constituency (2001–2002), Mayor of Nogaro (1989–2008).
Charles Tyner, 92, American actor (Cool Hand Luke, The Outlaw Josey Wales, Planes, Trains and Automobiles).
Josip Weber, 52, Croatian-Belgian footballer (Cercle Brugge, Croatia national team, Belgium national team), cancer.
Dov Yaffe, 89, Lithuanian-born Israeli rabbi.

9
Ingrid Almqvist, 90, Swedish Olympic javelin thrower (1948, 1956, 1960).
Rob Astbury, 69, Australian sports journalist.
Grete Berget, 63, Norwegian politician, Minister of Children and Family Affairs (1991–1996), cancer.
Sir Arlington Butler, 79, Bahamian politician.
Bill Cashmore, 56, British actor (Brass Eye, Fist of Fun).
Donald S. Coffey, 85, American physician.
Fred Cole, 69, American singer and musician (The Lollipop Shoppe, Dead Moon), liver disease.
Tom Coughlan, 83, New Zealand rugby union player (South Canterbury, national team).
Akbar Eftekhari, 73, Iranian footballer (Persepolis F.C.).
Robert Gensburg, 78, American lawyer.
John Hillerman, 84, American actor (Magnum, P.I., Chinatown, Blazing Saddles), Emmy winner (1987), heart disease.
Muhammad Ibrahim Joyo, 102, Pakistani writer and scholar.
Gene Kotlarek, 77, American Olympic ski jumper (1960, 1964).
Chuck Mosley, 57, American singer (Faith No More, Bad Brains) and songwriter ("We Care a Lot"), drug overdose.
Canaan Zinothi Moyo, 84, Zimbabwean politician.
Chuck Nergard, 88, American politician, member of the Florida House of Representatives (1967–1976, 1978–1990).
Priyan, 53, Indian cinematographer, heart attack.
Jim Sladky, 70, American figure skater, world championship silver (1970) and bronze medalist (1969, 1971, 1972).
Shyla Stylez, 35, Canadian pornographic actress.

10
Duffy Ayers, 102, English portrait painter.
Moniz Bandeira, 81, Brazilian political scientist, historian and poet.
Guy Barrabino, 83, French Olympic fencer (1960).
Márcia Cabrita, 53, Brazilian actress (Sai de Baixo, Sete Pecados, Novo Mundo), ovarian cancer.
Neil Clerehan, 94, Australian architect.
Bernhard Eckstein, 82, German Olympic racing cyclist, world champion (1960).
Geoff Fletcher, 74, English rugby league player (Leigh Centurions).
Mohan Kumar, 83, Indian director.
Ray Lovelock, 67, Italian actor (Fiddler on the Roof, Let Sleeping Corpses Lie, Murder Rock) and musician, cancer.
Ron Mabra, 66, American football player (Atlanta Falcons, New York Jets).
Knut Mørkved, 79, Norwegian diplomat.
Erika Remberg, 85, Austrian actress (The Lickerish Quartet).
A. G. Milkha Singh, 75, Indian cricketer.
Peter Trower, 87, Canadian poet and novelist.
Alan Tuffin, 84, British trade unionist.
Mikhail Nikolayevich Zadornov, 69, Latvian-born Russian comedian and writer, cancer.

11
Henry Badenhorst, 51, South African businessman, co-founder of Gaydar, suicide by jumping.
Kirti Nidhi Bista, 90, Nepali politician, Prime Minister (1969–1970, 1971–1973, 1977–1979), cancer.
Vanu Bose, 52, American engineer and technology executive, pulmonary embolism.
Lars Oftedal Broch, 78, Norwegian judge.
Chiquito de la Calzada, 85, Spanish singer, actor and comedian, complications of cardiac catheterization.
Tom Cornsweet, 88, American psychologist.
Frank Corsaro, 92, American opera director and actor (Rachel, Rachel).
Floyd Crawford, 88, Canadian ice hockey player, 1959 world championship team.
Gemze de Lappe, 95, American dancer, pneumonia.
Carlos Dívar, 75, Spanish magistrate, President of Audiencia Nacional (2001–2008), General Council of the Judiciary and Supreme Court (2008–2012), pulmonary edema.
Henry Emeleus, 87, British geologist.
Willy Johan Fredriksen, 87, Norwegian diplomat.
Edward S. Herman, 92, American economist and journalist (Manufacturing Consent), bladder cancer.
Franco Hernandez, 26, Filipino television personality (It's Showtime) and singer, drowned.
Nate Hobgood-Chittick, 42, American football player (St. Louis Rams, Kansas City Chiefs, San Francisco 49ers), heart attack.
Huang Shisong, 98, Chinese meteorologist.
Baard Owe, 81, Norwegian-born Danish actor (The Kingdom), lung cancer.
Alessandro Pansa, 55, Italian business executive, heart attack.
Rance Pless, 91, American baseball player (Kansas City Athletics).
Jeffrey T. Richelson, 67, American author and national security researcher, cancer.
Amar Rouaï, 85, Algerian football player and manager.
Valery Rozov, 52, Russian BASE jumper, wingsuit crash.
Ian Wachtmeister, 84, Swedish metallurgic executive, count and politician, MP (1991–1994), founder of New Democracy, lymphoma.

12
Bobby Baker, 89, American political adviser to Lyndon Johnson.
Michel Chapuis, 87, French classical organist and pedagogue.
Georges Firmin, 93, French Olympic weightlifter.
Miklós Holop, 92, Hungarian water polo player, Olympic silver medalist (1948).
James O'Connor, 87, American sociologist and political economist.
Børre Olsen, 53, Norwegian jewelry designer.
Bernard Panafieu, 86, French Roman Catholic cardinal, Archbishop of Aix (1978–1994) and Marseille (1995–2006).
Wendy Pepper, 53, American fashion designer (Project Runway), complications from pneumonia.
Lady Cynthia Postan, 99, English horticulturist.
John C. Raines, 84, American civil rights activist and member of the Citizens' Commission to Investigate the FBI, congestive heart failure.
Jack Ralite, 89, French politician, MP (1973–1981), Minister of Health (1981–1983) and Senator (1995–2011).
Geoffrey Alexander Rowley-Conwy, 9th Baron Langford, 105, British Army officer and hereditary peer.
Eric Salzman, 84, American composer (Center for Contemporary Opera), heart attack.
Edith Savage-Jennings, 93, American civil rights activist.
Liz Smith, 94, American gossip columnist (Newsday, New York Daily News).
Mikko Vainio, 94, Finnish politician, MP (1970–1975, 1983–1987).
Santiago Vernazza, 89, Argentine footballer (River Plate, AC Milan, national team).
Lawrence R. Yetka, 93, American judge (Associate Justice of the Minnesota Supreme Court, 1973–1993) and politician (Minnesota House of Representatives, 1951–1961).

13
Jeff Capel II, 64, American college basketball coach (North Carolina A&T, Old Dominion), amyotrophic lateral sclerosis.
Bobby Doerr, 99, American Hall of Fame baseball player (Boston Red Sox).
Vladimir Goldner, 83, Croatian physician.
Thomas J. Hudner Jr., 93, American naval aviator, Medal of Honor recipient (Battle of Chosin Reservoir).
Jeremy Hutchinson, Baron Hutchinson of Lullington, 102, British lawyer and life peer.
Peter Imbert, Baron Imbert, 84, British police officer, Commissioner of the Metropolitan Police (1987–1992) and life peer.
Alina Janowska, 94, Polish actress, Alzheimer's disease.
Yannis Kapsis, 88, Greek journalist (Ta Nea) and politician, Deputy Minister of Foreign Affairs (1982–1989).
Haskell Monroe, 86, American educator, President of the University of Texas at El Paso (1980–1987) and the University of Missouri (1987–1993).
Frank O'Connor, 94, Australian footballer (Melbourne).
Kevin Phillips, 63, Canadian politician, member of the Legislative Assembly of Saskatchewan (since 2011).
David Poisson, 35, French Olympic alpine skier (2010, 2014), training crash.
František Poláček, 77, Czechoslovak Olympic boxer.
Jim Rivera, 96, American baseball player (St. Louis Browns, Chicago White Sox, Kansas City Athletics).
Reynir Sigurðsson, 89, Icelandic Olympic sprinter.

14
Jack Blessing, 66, American actor (Moonlighting, The Naked Truth, George Lopez), pancreatic cancer.
Grahame Chevalier, 80, South African cricketer (Western Province).
Thomas Hansell, 63, English cricketer.
Abdul Mannan Hossain, 65, Indian politician, MP (2004–2014).
Hou Zongbin, 88, Chinese politician, Governor of Shaanxi (1990–1992).
Toivo Jaatinen, 91, Finnish sculptor.
Barbara Jones-Hogu, 79, American artist.
Albert C. Ledner, 93, American architect.
Little Mama, c.79, African-born chimpanzee (Lion Country Safari), oldest on record, kidney failure.
Uwe Reinhardt, 80, German-born Canadian-American economist (Princeton University).
Jean-Pierre Schmitz, 85, Luxembourgian road bicycle racer.
Wolfgang Schreyer, 89, German writer.
Shyama, 82, Indian actress.
Gunnar Uldall, 76, German politician.
Nancy Zieman, 64, American writer and television host (Sewing with Nancy), cancer.

15
Luis Bacalov, 84, Argentine-born Italian composer (Il Postino), Oscar winner (1996), stroke.
Jill Barklem, 66, British writer and illustrator (Brambly Hedge).
Keith Barron, 83, British actor (Duty Free, The Odd Man, The Nigel Barton Plays).
Camilo Cerviño, 89, Argentine footballer.
Sara Craven, 79, British author.
David S. Cunningham Jr., 82, American politician, Los Angeles City Councilman (1973–1987) cancer.
Sister Dame Pauline Engel, 87, New Zealand nun and educator (Carmel College).
Bill Haigh, 93, Australian politician, member of the New South Wales Legislative Assembly for Maroubra (1968–1983).
Françoise Héritier, 84, French anthropologist, ethnologist and feminist.
Robert G. Jahn, 87, American physicist and parapsychologist.
Frans Krajcberg, 96, Polish-born Brazilian artist.
Lil Peep, 21, American singer and rapper, drug overdose.
Joy Lofthouse, 94, British World War II pilot.
Lure, 28, American thoroughbred racehorse.
Moana Manley, 82, New Zealand swimmer and beauty queen, Miss New Zealand (1954), complications from stroke.
J. Steve Mostyn, 46, American lawyer and philanthropist, suicide.
Kunwar Narayan, 90, Indian poet.
Hamad Ndikumana, 39, Rwandan footballer.
Eric P. Newman, 106, American numismatist.
Bert Ormond, 86, British-born New Zealand footballer (Falkirk, New Zealand national team).
Jaroslav Vanek, 87, Czech-born American economist.
Halina Wasilewska-Trenkner, 75, Polish economist.

16
Michelle Dumon, 96, Belgian WWII resistance agent (Comet line).
Tobias Enverga, 61, Filipino-born Canadian politician, Senator (since 2012).
Tommy Farrer, 94, English footballer (Bishop Auckland).
Wal Fife, 88, Australian politician and businessman, MP (1975–1993) and Minister for Business and Consumer Affairs (1977–1979), Education (1979–1982) and Aviation (1982–1983).
John Gambino, 77, Italian-born American mobster.
Gary the Goat, 6, Australian comedic goat, euthanised.
Adalberto Giazotto, 77, Italian physicist.
Robert Hirsch, 92, French comedian and actor (Hiver 54, l'abbé Pierre; Le Misanthrope; The Caretaker), César Award winner (1990).
*Hsiao Teng-tzang, 83, Taiwanese politician, member of the Legislative Yuan (1973–1986), Minister of Justice (1988–1989).
Franciszek Kornicki, 100, Polish fighter pilot, commander of the No. 308 and the No. 317 Fighter Squadrons.
Ferdie Pacheco, 89, American physician and boxing cornerman (Muhammad Ali).
Mohammad Poursattar, 78, Iranian actor (Caravans, The Messiah, Prophet Joseph).
Kenneth Ryskamp, 85, American judge, member of the U.S. District Court for Southern Florida (since 1986).
Jack Stauffacher, 96, American printer and typographer.
Jimmy Steele, 55, British dentist, brain cancer.
Greg Standridge, 50, American politician, member of the Arkansas Senate (since 2015), cancer.
Hiromi Tsuru, 57, Japanese voice actress (Dragon Ball, Metal Gear Solid, Ghost Sweeper Mikami), aortic dissection.
Ann Wedgeworth, 83, American actress (Three's Company, Evening Shade, Steel Magnolias), Tony winner (1978).

17
Narsimh Bhandari, 83, Indian cricketer.
Steve Bowman, 72, American football player (New York Giants).
J. C. Caroline, 84, American football player (Chicago Bears).
Djohan Effendi, 78, Indonesian politician and activist, Secretary of State (2000–2001).
Aijalon Gomes, 38, American teacher, imprisoned by the Government of North Korea in 2010.
Bert Hohol, 94, Canadian politician.
Lilli Hornig, 96, Czech-American scientist, feminist activist.
Earle Hyman, 91, American actor (The Cosby Show, ThunderCats, The Lady from Dubuque).
Erich Kukk, 89, Estonian phycologist and conservationist.
Lucas Li Jing-feng, 95, Chinese clandestine Roman Catholic prelate, Coadjutor Bishop (1980–1983) and Bishop of Fengxiang (since 1983).
William Mayer, 91, American composer.
William Pachner, 102, Czech-born American painter.
Ulrich Petersen, 89, Peruvian-born American geologist.
Bill Pitt, 80, British politician, MP for Croydon North West (1981–1983).
Robert D. Raiford, 89, American news anchor (WCNC-TV) and actor (The Handmaid's Tale, Super Mario Bros.).
Salvatore Riina, 87, Italian mobster, capo of the Sicilian Mafia, sepsis.
Aleksandr Salnikov, 68, Ukrainian basketball player, Olympic bronze medalist (1976, 1980).
Howard Bruner Schaffer, 88, American diplomat, Ambassador to Bangladesh (1984–1987).
Les Tonks, 75, English rugby league footballer (Featherstone Rovers).
Hans-Heinrich Voigt, 96, German astronomer.
Rikard Wolff, 59, Swedish actor (House of Angels) and singer ("Pojken på månen"), pulmonary emphysema.
Óscar Zamora Medinaceli, 83, Bolivian politician, complications from a stroke.
Wan Zawawi, 68, Malaysian Olympic footballer (1972).

18
Azzedine Alaïa, 82, Tunisian-French fashion designer.
Giorgio Antonucci, 84, Italian physician.
Bob Borkowski, 91, American baseball player (Chicago Cubs, Cincinnati Reds, Brooklyn Dodgers).
Flawless Sabrina, 78, American drag queen and trans rights activist.
William Hoeveler, 95, American judge, member of the U.S. District Court for Southern Florida (1977–1991).
Fotis Kafatos, 77, Greek biologist, founder and president of European Research Council (2005–2010).
José Manuel Maza, 66, Spanish lawyer and criminologist, Attorney General (since 2016), kidney infection.
Commins Menapi, 40, Solomon Islands footballer (Sydney United, Waitakere, national team).
John Murray, 93, British Olympic ice hockey player (1948).
Youssouf Ouédraogo, 64, Burkinabé politician, Prime Minister (1992–1994).
Friedel Rausch, 77, German football player (Schalke 04) and manager, skin cancer.
Ben Riley, 84, American jazz drummer (Thelonious Monk, Kenny Barron, Sphere).
Gillian Rolton, 61, Australian equestrian, Olympic champion (1992, 1996), endometrial cancer.
Pancho Segura, 96, Ecuadorian tennis player, Parkinson's disease.
Colin Seymour-Ure, 79, English academic.
Ken Shapiro, 75, American writer, producer, film director, and actor (Texaco Star Theatre, The Groove Tube, Modern Problems), cancer.
Peter Spufford, 83, British historian.
Naim Süleymanoğlu, 50, Bulgarian-Turkish weightlifter, Olympic champion (1988, 1992, 1996), liver disease.
Malcolm Young, 64, Scottish-born Australian Hall of Fame guitarist and songwriter (AC/DC), dementia.

19
Claudio Báez, 69, Mexican actor and singer.
Peter Baldwin, 86, American actor and director (The Wonder Years, Sanford and Son, Newhart), Emmy winner (1989).
Ronnie Butler, 80, Bahamian singer and entertainer, cancer.
John Carlin, 88, Scottish actor.
*Andrea Cordero Lanza di Montezemolo, 92, Italian Roman Catholic cardinal and Vatican diplomat, Apostolic Nuncio (1977–2001).
Moussa Moumouni Djermakoye, 73, Nigerien politician.
Alex Ifeanyichukwu Ekwueme, 85, Nigerian politician, Vice President (1979–1983).
Rita Koiral, 58, Indian actress, cancer.
Charles Manson, 83, American criminal (Tate murders), songwriter (Lie: The Love and Terror Cult) and cult leader (Manson Family), cardiac arrest due to colon cancer.
Fernando Matthei, 92, Chilean air force general, Commander-in-Chief (1978–1991).
Milan Moguš, 90, Croatian linguist and academician.
Warren "Pete" Moore, 79, American Hall of Fame singer (The Miracles), songwriter ("The Tracks of My Tears", "Ain't That Peculiar"), record producer and arranger.
Jana Novotná, 49, Czech tennis player, cancer.
Luther Rackley, 71, American basketball player (Cleveland Cavaliers, New York Knicks).
Della Reese, 86, American actress (Touched by an Angel, Chico and the Man) and singer ("Don't You Know?").
*Tai Chen-yao, 69, Taiwanese politician, member of the Legislative Yuan (1990–1996, 1999–2002), pancreatic cancer.
Mel Tillis, 85, American Hall of Fame country music singer-songwriter ("I Ain't Never", "Coca-Cola Cowboy") and actor (The Cannonball Run), respiratory failure due to diverticulitis.
Elias Tolentino, 75, Filipino Olympic basketball player (1968).

20
István Almási, 73, Hungarian politician, mayor of Hódmezővásárhely (since 2012).
Iris Campbell, 77, American health advocate and politician, First Lady of South Carolina (1987–1995).
Priya Ranjan Dasmunsi, 72, Indian politician, MP (1971–1977, 1984–1989, 1996–1998, 1999–2009), Minister of Parliamentary Affairs and Information and Broadcasting (2004–2008).
Eugene Domack, 61, American geologist.
Terry Glenn, 43, American football player (New England Patriots, Green Bay Packers, Dallas Cowboys), traffic collision.
John Gordon, 92, English author (The Giant Under The Snow), Alzheimer's disease.
Amir Hamed, 55, Uruguayan writer and translator, cancer.
Jean Hearn, 96, Australian politician, Senator (1980–1985).
Ismaïl Khelil, 85, Tunisian diplomat and politician, Governor of the Central Bank of Tunisia (1987–1990), Minister of Foreign Affairs (1990) and Ambassador to the United States (1991).
István Konkoly, 87, Hungarian Roman Catholic prelate, Bishop of Szombathely (1987–2006).
Raimo Lindholm, 86, Finnish Olympic basketball player.
Víctor Hipólito Martínez, 92, Argentine lawyer and politician, Vice President (1983–1989).
Ernestine Petras, 93, American baseball player (AAGPBL).
K. V. L. Narayan Rao, 63, Indian television executive (NDTV).
Hugh Ross, 80, Canadian-born American bridge player.
Laila Sari, 82, Indonesian singer and actress (Wadjah Seorang Laki-laki).
Pamela Sklar, 58, American psychiatrist and neuroscientist.
Alan Walker, 79, British paleoanthropologist, discoverer of "the Black Skull".
Janusz Wójcik, 64, Polish politician, football player (Gwardia, Hutnik Warszawa) and coach, member of the Sejm (2005–2007).
Izabella Zielińska, 106, Polish pianist and educator.

21
Paul D. Aasness, 77, American politician, member of the Minnesota House of Representatives (1979–1982).
Derek Barber, Baron Barber of Tewkesbury, 99, British life peer, Member of the House of Lords (1992–2016).
Peter Berling, 83, German actor and writer (Aguirre, the Wrath of God, The Name of the Rose).
Rodney Bewes, 79, British actor (The Likely Lads, Whatever Happened to the Likely Lads?) and writer (Dear Mother...Love Albert).
Sudip Datta Bhaumik, Indian journalist, shot.
Harry Blamires, 101, British Anglican theologian, literary critic, and novelist.
Alice Burks, 97, American author.
David Cassidy, 67, American pop singer ("Cherish", "How Can I Be Sure") and actor (The Partridge Family), liver failure.
Wayne Cochran, 78, American soul singer and songwriter ("Last Kiss"), cancer.
George E. Collins, 89, American mathematician and computer scientist.
Milein Cosman, 96, German-born British artist.
Hugh Currie, 92, Canadian ice hockey player (Montreal Canadiens).
Luis Garisto, 71, Uruguayan football player (Cobreloa, national team) and coach (Peñarol, Club Atlas, Deportivo Toluca F.C.).
Iola Gregory, 71, Welsh actress (Pobol y Cwm).
Valentin Huot, 88, French racing cyclist.
Guillermo Irizarry, 101, Puerto Rican politician, Secretary of State of Puerto Rico (1966–1969).
Keith Muxlow, 84, American politician, member of the Michigan House of Representatives (1981–1992).
Andrew Jonathan Nok, 55, Nigerian biochemist.
László Pál, 75, Hungarian politician, Minister of Industry and Trade (1994–95).
Ann Sloat, 89, Canadian politician, Ontario MPP (1984–1985).
Masao Sugiuchi, 97, Japanese Go player.
Joseph White, 84, American psychologist and civil rights activist, heart attack.

22
George Avakian, 98, American record producer and executive (Columbia Records).
Norman Baker, 89, American explorer, plane crash.
Salvador E. Casellas, 82, Puerto Rican judge, member of the U.S. District Court for Puerto Rico (1994–2005).
Akhmed Chatayev, 37, Russian jihadist, shot.
John Coates Jr., 79, American jazz pianist.
Hilda Eisen, 100, Polish-born American philanthropist and Holocaust survivor.
Mona Fong, 83, Hong Kong film producer (The 36th Chamber of Shaolin).
Andrzej Wincenty Górski, 97, Polish academic.
Samuel P. Hays, 96, American historian.
Jon Hendricks, 96, American jazz singer and songwriter (Lambert, Hendricks & Ross).
Maurice Hinchey, 79, American politician, member of the U.S. House of Representatives for New York's 26th (1993–2003) and 22nd district (2003–2013), frontotemporal dementia.
Imre Hollai, 92, Hungarian diplomat, President of the United Nations General Assembly (1982–83).
Dmitri Hvorostovsky, 55, Russian opera singer, brain cancer.
Bobi Jones, 88, Welsh author and academic.
Vartan Kechichian, 84, Syrian-born Armenian Catholic hierarch, Coadjutor Archbishop of Eastern Europe for Armenians (2001–2005).
Tommy Keene, 59, American singer and songwriter.
Otto Luttrop, 78, German football player and coach.
Juan Luis Maurás, 95, Chilean politician, President of the Senate (1966) and the Chamber of Deputies (1958).
Charles C. McDonald, 84, American USAF general.
Biju Phukan, 69, Indian actor, heart disease.
Stefan Radt, 90, Dutch classicist, professor at the University of Groningen (1967–1987).
Bobbie L. Sterne, 97, American politician, Mayor of Cincinnati (1975–1976, 1978–1979).
Edward C. Taylor, 94, American chemist.
William J. White, 92, American Marine Corps Lieutenant General.

23
François Aquin, 88, Canadian politician, Member of the National Assembly of Quebec (1966–1969).
Tullio Baraglia, 83, Italian rower, Olympic silver (1960) and bronze medalist (1968).
Donal Creed, 93, Irish politician, TD (1965–1989) and MEP (1973–1977), Alzheimer's disease.
Gerald Doucet, 80, Canadian politician.
Miguel Alfredo González, 34, Cuban baseball player (Philadelphia Phillies), traffic collision.
Allan Harris, 74, English footballer (Queens Park Rangers, Chelsea).
Anthony Harvey, 87, British director (The Lion in Winter) and film editor (Dr. Strangelove, Lolita).
Laeticia Kikonyogo, 77, Ugandan judge, member of the Supreme Court, heart attack.
Carol Neblett, 71, American operatic soprano.
Paul Paviot, 91, French film director.
Stela Popescu, 81, Romanian actress (Uncle Marin, the Billionaire).
Osborne Riviere, 85, Dominican politician, Acting Prime Minister (2004).
Joe Schipp, 85, Australian politician, businessman and grazier, member of the New South Wales Legislative Assembly for Wagga Wagga (1975–1999).
Dimitri Sjöberg, 37, Finnish tango singer, injuries sustained in a fall.
Craig Tieszen, 68, American politician, member of the South Dakota Senate (2009–2017) and House of Representatives (since 2017), drowned.
Ellsworth Webb, 86, American Olympic boxer.
Ingrid I. Willoch, 74, Norwegian politician, MP (1981–1993).
Manjit Wolstenholme, 53, British businesswoman (Future Publishing, Unite Group, Provident Financial), heart attack.
Zhang Yang, 66, Chinese general, suicide by hanging.

24
Ángel Berni, 86, Paraguayan footballer.
Heribert Calleen, 93, German sculptor.
Wesley L. Fox, 86, American Marine Corps colonel, Medal of Honor recipient (1971).
Neil Gillman, 84, Canadian-born American rabbi and philosopher, cancer.
Steve Hutchins, 61, Australian politician, Senator (1998–2011), cancer.
Stephen Knapp, 70, American artist.
Lowen Kruse, 88, American politician, member of the Nebraska Legislature (2001–2009), cancer.
Frank Kuchta, 81, American football player (Washington Redskins, Denver Broncos).
Reijo Luostarinen, 77, Finnish organisational theorist and businessman.
Mitch Margo, 70, American singer and songwriter (The Tokens).
Cornel Pelmuș, 84, Romanian Olympic fencer (1960).
Clotilde Rosa, 87, Portuguese harpist, music educator and composer.
Hermann Schwörer, 95, German businessman and politician, MEP (1970–1979).
Edward Scrobe, 94, American Olympic artistic gymnast (1948, 1952).
Gaetan Serré, 79, Canadian politician, member of the House of Commons (1968–1972).
Bari Siddiqui, 63, Bangladeshi singer and songwriter, kidney disease.
Gabriel Simo, 80, Cameroonian Roman Catholic prelate, Auxiliary Bishop of Douala (1987–1994) and Bafoussam (1994–2013).
John Thierry, 46, American football player (Chicago Bears, Green Bay Packers), heart attack.

25
John Black, 84, American politician, member of the Georgia State Senate (1994–1996).
Bertha Calloway, 92, American historian and museologist, founder of Great Plains Black History Museum, pneumonia.
Ignazio Colnaghi, 93, Italian voice actor and actor.
Steve Doszpot, 69, Hungarian-born Australian politician, member of the Australian Capital Territory Legislative Assembly (since 2008), liver cancer.
Sotir Ferrara, 79, Italian Italo-Albanian Greek Catholic hierarch, Bishop of Piana degli Albanesi (1988–2013).
Edward Fudge, 73, American theologian.
Jesús Gómez, 76, Mexican equestrian, Olympic bronze medalist (1980).
Ken Gray, 81, American football player (Chicago Cardinals, Houston Oilers).
Rosario Green, 76, Mexican economist, diplomat and politician, Minister for Foreign Affairs (1998–2000) and Senator (2006–2012).
Rance Howard, 89, American actor (Apollo 13, Ed Wood, Frost/Nixon), heart failure.
Robert Howie, 88, Canadian politician.
Rosendo Huesca Pacheco, 85, Mexican Roman Catholic prelate, Archbishop of Puebla de los Ángeles (1977–2009).
Steve "Snapper" Jones, 75, American basketball player (New Orleans Buccaneers, Dallas Chaparrals, Portland Trail Blazers) and analyst (NBA on NBC).
Anna Kuzmina, 84, Russian Yakut actress.
Biddy White Lennon, 71, Irish actress (The Riordans) and food writer.
John M. Lewellen, 87, American politician, member of the Arkansas House of Representatives (1999–2004).
Bogdan Maglich, 89, Yugoslav-born American nuclear physicist.
Julio Oscar Mechoso, 62, American actor (Planet Terror, Jurassic Park III, Bad Boys), heart attack.
Harry Pregerson, 94, American judge, member of the U.S. 9th Circuit Court of Appeals (1979–2015) and U.S. District Court for Central California (1967–1979).
Vladimir Shkurikhin, 59, Russian volleyball player, Olympic silver medalist (1988).

26
Oluyemi Adeniji, 83, Nigerian diplomat and politician, Minister of Foreign Affairs (2003–2006).
Khawaja Akmal, 69, Pakistani actor and comedian, heart attack.
Ruth Bancroft, 109, American landscape architect, creator of Ruth Bancroft Garden.
José Doth de Oliveira, 79, Brazilian Roman Catholic prelate, Bishop of Iguatu (2000–2009), complications from Alzheimer's disease.
Garnett Thomas Eisele, 94, American judge, member of the U.S. District Court for Eastern Arkansas (1970–1991).
Frances M. Gage, 93, Canadian sculptor.
Vicente García Bernal, 88, Mexican Roman Catholic prelate, Bishop of Ciudad Obregón (1988–2005).
Armando Hart, 87, Cuban politician and revolutionary, leader of 26th of July Movement and minister of Education (1959–1965) and Culture (1976–1997), respiratory failure.
Hou Bo, 93, Chinese photographer.
Georg Iggers, 90, American historian and civil rights advocate, complications from a cerebral hemorrhage.
Rahija Khanam Jhunu, 74, Bangladeshi dancer.
Alessandro Leogrande, 40, Italian journalist, heart attack.
Mick Martyn, 81, English rugby league footballer (Leigh).
Hans Mol, 95, Dutch sociologist.
Julia Mullock, 89, American Korean royal.
Christian Vicente Noel, 80, Filipino Roman Catholic prelate, Bishop of Talibon (1986–2014).
José Pedro Pozzi, 92, Italian-born Argentine Roman Catholic prelate, Bishop of Alto Valle del Río Negro (1993–2003).
Eliezer Spiegel, 95, Israeli football player and manager.
Timothy Stamps, 81, Welsh-born Zimbabwean politician, Minister of Health (1986–2002), lung infection.
Peggy Vining, 88, American poet.
W. Marvin Watson, 93, American presidential advisor and Postmaster General (1968–1969).

27
Robert Batailly, 83, French politician, MEP (1989).
Narayanrao Bodas, 85, Indian singer.
Loïc Bouvard, 88, French politician, MP (1988–2012).
Dermot Drummy, 56, English football player (Blackpool) and coach (Chelsea Academy, Crawley Town), suicide.
Bill Harris, 83, American politician, member (2000–2010) and President (2005–2010) of the Ohio Senate.
Davor Jović, 61, Croatian army officer and kickboxer.
Bud Moore, 92, American NASCAR Hall of Fame team owner (Bud Moore Engineering).
Robert Popwell, 66, American bass guitarist (The Young Rascals, The Crusaders).
José María Romero de Tejada, 69, Spanish jurist and prosecutor, Attorney General of Catalonia (since 2013), complications from leukemia.
Bob Seidemann, 75, American rock album cover designer (Blind Faith) and photographer (Grateful Dead, Janis Joplin), Parkinson's disease.
Inge Solar, 90, Austrian Olympic skater (1948).
Warren Spannaus, 86, American lawyer and politician, Attorney General of Minnesota (1971–1983), complications from cancer.
Cristina Stamate, 71, Romanian actress, stroke.

28
Pentti Alonen, 92, Finnish Olympic alpine skier (1948, 1952, 1956).
Sir Peter Burt, 73, Scottish businessman, chief executive (1996–2001) and Governor (2001–2003) of Bank of Scotland, chairman of ITV plc (2004–2007).
Alice Lok Cahana, 88, Hungarian artist and concentration camp survivor.
Joseph N. Crowley, 84, American academic administrator, President of University of Nevada, Reno (1978–2001), pneumonia.
Magín Díaz, 94, Colombian folk singer and songwriter, Latin Grammy winner (2017).
George Feher, 93, Czechoslovak-born American biophysicist.
Patrícia Gabancho, 65, Argentine-born Spanish writer and journalist, lung cancer.
Fritz Graf, 94, American National Football League official.
Rafael Llano Cifuentes, 84, Mexican-born Brazilian Roman Catholic prelate, Bishop of Nova Friburgo (2004–2010).
Jimmy McEwan, 88, Scottish footballer (Raith Rovers, Aston Villa).
Clarrie Millar, 92, Australian politician, MP for Wide Bay (1974–1990).
Don Moore, 89, American judge and politician, member of the Tennessee House of Representatives (1956–1958, 1964–1966) and Senate (1966–1970).
Sir Martin Nourse, 85, British jurist, Lord Justice of Appeal (1985–2001).
Shadia, 86, Egyptian actress and singer, stroke.
Zdeněk Šreiner, 63, Czech footballer (Baník Ostrava), Olympic champion (1980).
Johan Steyn, Baron Steyn, 85, South African-born British jurist and life peer, Law Lord (1995–2005).
Thodupuzha Vasanthi, 65, Indian actress, cancer.

29
Maria Luisa Altieri Biagi, 87, Italian linguist.
Sol Bellear, 66, Australian Aboriginal rights activist.
E. Chandrasekharan Nair, 88, Indian politician.
Don Coles, 90, Canadian poet.
Willie John Daly, 92, Irish hurler.
Belmiro de Azevedo, 79, Portuguese lumber manufacturing executive, founder of Sonae.
Kenneth S. Deffeyes, 85, American geologist.
Jerry Fodor, 82, American philosopher and cognitive scientist, complications from Parkinson's disease.
Fran Hopper, 95, American cartoonist.
Aminul Islam, 82, Bangladeshi academic.
Tomáš Ježek, 77, Czech economist and politician, member of the Czech National Council (1990–1992) and Chamber of Deputies (1993–1996).
Gencay Kasapçı, 84, Turkish painter.
Charles E. Merrill Jr., 97, American educator (founder of Commonwealth School), author and philanthropist.
Véronique Nordey, 78, French actress, cancer.
Heather North, 71, American actress (Scooby-Doo, Days of Our Lives, The Barefoot Executive), cardiac arrest.
Slobodan Praljak, 72, Croatian military officer and war criminal, suicide by cyanide poisoning.
Verena Stefan, 70, Swiss writer.
William Steinkraus, 92, American equestrian, Olympic champion (1968).
Ján Strausz, 75, Slovak footballer.
László Szabó, 62, Hungarian Olympic handball player (1980, 1988).
P. Vallalperuman, 67, Indian politician, heart illness.
Robert Walker, 80, American blues musician, cancer.
Tony Whitten, 64, British conservationist, traffic collision
Bondan Winarno, 67, Indonesian culinary writer.
Mary Lee Woods, 93, British mathematician and computer programmer.

30
Kalabhavan Abi, 52, Indian actor and comedian, leukaemia.
Taher Ahmadzadeh, 96, Iranian politician, Governor of Khorasan Province (1979).
Unity Bainbridge, 101, Canadian artist and writer.
Terence Beesley, 60, British actor (EastEnders, The Phantom of the Opera, War & Peace), suicide by inert gas asphyxiation.
Sreerupa Bose, 66, Indian cricketer.
Habibollah Chaichian, 94, Iranian poet.
Alfie Curtis, 87, British actor (Star Wars, The Elephant Man, Cribb).
Clifford David, 89, American actor (Bill and Ted's Excellent Adventure, Signs, Kinsey) and singer.
Alan D'Ardis Erskine-Murray, 14th Lord Elibank, 93, Scottish nobleman.
Russell Evans, 52, English cricket player and umpire, complications during surgery.
Dick Gernert, 89, American baseball player (Boston Red Sox).
Colin Groves, 75, British-born Australian biologist and professor (Australian National University).
Donald Harper, 85, American diver, Olympic silver medalist (1956).
Annisul Huq, 65, Bangladeshi businessman, mayor of Dhaka North City Corporation (since 2015).
Gary Ingram, 84, American politician, member of the Idaho House of Representatives (1973–1980, 2012), cancer.
Alain Jessua, 85, French film director and screenwriter (Léon la lune, The Killing Game).
Bertha Kawakami, 86, American politician and educator, member of the Hawaii House of Representatives (1987-2006).
George March, 85, English cricketer.
Alfredo Milani, 93, Italian motorbike racer.
Jon Naar, 97, British-American author and photographer.
Jim Nabors, 87, American actor (Gomer Pyle, U.S.M.C., The Andy Griffith Show, The Best Little Whorehouse in Texas) and singer.
Surin Pitsuwan, 68, Thai diplomat and politician, Minister of Foreign Affairs (1997–2001) and Secretary General of ASEAN (2008–2012), heart attack.
Marina Popovich, 86, Russian test pilot.
Vincent Scully, 97, American architecture historian, complications from Parkinson's disease.
Akram Zaki, 86, Pakistani politician and diplomat, cardiac illness.

References

2017-11
 11